is a professional Japanese baseball player. He plays pitcher for the Yokohama DeNA BayStars.

References 

1997 births
Living people
Japanese baseball players
Nippon Professional Baseball pitchers
Yokohama DeNA BayStars players
Baseball people from Ibaraki Prefecture